Mitromorpha panaulax is an extinct species of sea snail, a marine gastropod mollusk in the family Mitromorphidae.
n

Description

Distribution
This extinct marine species was found in Pliocene strata in Loire-Atlantiqye, France.

References

 Cossmann (M.), 1901 - Essais de Paléoconchologie comparée. livraison 4, pp. 1–293

panaulax
Molluscs described in 1901